Spaghetti worm can refer to:
 Terebellidae, a family of marine polychaete worms
 Trypanorhyncha, an order of cestodes (parasitic flatworms)

Animal common name disambiguation pages